Georgia State Route 22 Connector may refer to:

 Georgia State Route 22 Connector (Columbus): a connector route of State Route 22 that exists entirely within Columbus
 Georgia State Route 22 Connector (Macon): a former connector route of State Route 22 that existed partially in Macon
 Georgia State Route 22 Connector (Milledgeville): a former connector route of State Route 22 that existed entirely within Milledgeville

022 Connector